In East Asian Buddhism, Shakyamuni Buddha of the Essential Teachings (Chapters 15-28) of the Lotus Sutra is considered the eternal Buddha.  In the sixteenth chapter of the Lotus Sutra, Shakyamuni Buddha reveals that he actually attained Buddhahood in the inconceivably remote past. The Eternal Buddha is contrasted to Shakyamuni Buddha who attained enlightenment for the first time in India, which was taught in the pre-Lotus Sutra teachings.

The belief in the Eternal Buddha transcends through time and is commonly associated with Shakyamuni Buddha, but can also refer to both his past and future incarnations. However, no exact definition of the Eternal Buddha is defined in the Lotus Sutra, which was also revealed by Siddhartha Gautama; thereby making open interpretations to various religious groups.

Lotus Sutra and tathagatagarbha doctrine

In east-Asian Buddhism, the Buddha of the Lotus Sutra is regarded as the eternal Buddha. "The Tathagata´s Lifespan" chapter (ch 16) of the Lotus Sutra portrays the Buddha as indicating that he became awakened countless aeons ("kalpas") ago.  The sutra itself, however, does not directly employ the phrase "eternal Buddha".

In China the Lotus Sutra was associated with the Mahaparinirvana Sutra, which propagates the tathagatagarbha-doctrine, and with the Awakening of Faith. The Mahaparinirvana Sutra presents the Buddha as eternal, and equates him with the Dharmakaya.

The Lotus Sutra itself does hardly seem to accept the tathagatagarbha-teachings. According to Paul Williams, this association may be explained by the systematization of the Lotus Sutra teachings by the Tiantai school, using teachings from other schools "to equate the Buddha of the Lotus Sutra with the ultimate truth and to teach a cosmic Buddha."

Understanding in east-Asian Buddhism

China
The Chinese Tiantai scholar Zhiyi (538–597) divided the sutra into the "trace teaching" about the historical Shakyamuni Buddha (ch 1-14) and the "origin teaching" (ch 15-28) revealing the original Buddha of inconceivable life span.  
Zhiyi viewed Shakyamuni Buddha of Ch 16 of the Lotus Sutra as a unification of the three Buddha bodies, possessing all three bodies, whereas other sutras are taught from the standpoint of a single Buddha body.

Japan
The Nichiren Shu, Rissho Kosei Kai and Kempon Hokke schools of Nichiren Buddhism revere Shakyamuni of Chapter 16 of the Lotus Sutra as the eternal Buddha. They also regard Shakyamuni of Ch 16 as a "Unification of the Three Bodies", as taught by Tiantai. Other Buddhas, such as Amida of the Jōdo and Jōdo Shinshū Schools, and Mahāvairocana of the Shingon School are seen as provisional manifestations of the Original Buddha Shakyamuni.

In Jōdo Shinshū or Pure Land Buddhism, Amida Buddha is viewed as the eternal Buddha who manifested as Shakyamuni in India and who is the personification of Nirvana itself.

Shingon Buddhism sees Vairochana Buddha as the personification of the dharmakaya, and hence as the eternal Buddha, and some within Shingon, following Kakuban, equate Vairochana and Amida.

See also
 
Adi-Buddha 
Angulimaliya Sutra
Lotus Sutra
Mahaparinirvana Sutra
Srimala Sutra
Tathagatagarbha Sutra
Tathagatagarbha
Trikaya
Eternal Christ

Notes

References

Sources

Further reading
 
 
 
 Xing, Guang (2005). Problem of the Buddha´s Short Lifespan, World Hongming Philosophical Quarterly 12, 1-12
 

Buddhas
Buddhist philosophical concepts
Nichiren Buddhism